Reneau Z. Peurifoy (October 14, 1949) is a self-help book author and marriage counselor.

Biography
His first book, Anxiety, Phobias & Panic: Taking Charge and Conquering Fear currently has over 180,000 copies in print. Originally published in 1988. A revised second edition was released by Warner Books in 1995. It was again updated and released in its third edition in 2005. It has a UK edition as well as editions in German, Spanish, and Hungarian. His second book, Overcoming Anxiety: From Short-Term Fixes to Long-Term Recovery, was released in 1997 by Henry Holt. It also has a Spanish edition and will soon be released in a German edition. His third book, Anger: Taming the Beast, was released in June 1999 by Kodansha America. It also has a Dutch edition and will soon be released in a German edition by Hans Huber.

Mr. Peurifoy's fourth book, Why Did God Give Us Emotions? was released in September 2009.

Personal

Mr. Peurifoy was in private practice for twenty years (1980 – 2000) as a marriage and family therapist specializing in anxiety disorders. He retired from private practice in 2000 and is currently teaching at Heald College in Sacramento, California.

References 

American self-help writers
Living people
Year of birth missing (living people)